Eugnosta chalicophora is a species of moth of the family Tortricidae. It is found in the Dominican Republic.

References

Moths described in 1999
Eugnosta